Arjunbhai Patel is an Indian politician. He was member of the Lok Sabha the lower house of Indian Parliament from Bulsar in Gujarat as a member of the Janata Dal in 1989.

References

External links
Official biographical sketch in Parliament of India website

India MPs 1989–1991
1928 births
Living people
Janata Dal politicians
Lok Sabha members from Gujarat